Ghanaian literature is literature produced by authors from Ghana or in the Ghanaian diaspora. The tradition of literature starts with a long oral tradition, was influence heavily by western literature during colonial rule, and became prominent with a post-colonial nationalist tradition in the mid 20th century. The current literary community continues with a diverse network of voices both within and outside the country today, including film, theatre, and modern digital formats such as blogging.

The most prominent authors are novelists J. E. Casely Hayford, Ayi Kwei Armah and Nii Ayikwei Parkes, who gained international acclaim with the books Ethiopia Unbound (1911), The Beautyful Ones Are Not Yet Born (1968) and Tail of the Blue Bird (2009), respectively. In addition to novels, other literature arts such as theatre and poetry have also had a very good development and support at the national level with prominent playwrights and poets Joe de Graft and Efua Sutherland. 

The Ghanaian national literature radio programme and accompanying publication Voices of Ghana (1955-1957) was one of the earliest on the African continent, and helped establish the  scope of the contemporary literary tradition in Ghana. Scholarship of Anglo-phone Africa sometimes favors literatures from other geographies, such as the literature of Nigeria.

Cinema

See also 

 List of Ghanaian writers
 Music of Ghana

Notes

References 

Ghanaian literature